The Little Walnut River Pratt Truss Bridge is a Pratt truss bridge constructed shortly after 1885, in Bois d'Arc, Kansas. It was constructed by the Kansas City Bridge and Iron Company as a carriage, horse and pedestrian bridge over the Little Hickory Creek, which joins the Walnut River in southern Butler County. It was added to the National Register of Historic Places in 2003.

The Bridge

The one lane bridge is no longer accessible to vehicle traffic. The bridge consists of two distinct spans, one span of 102 feet and the other 75 feet in length, both of which are of the Pratt Truss bridge design.

The supporting structure is constructed of iron manufactured by the Carnegie Steel Company. The road surface is heavy timber. The total length of the bridge is 196.8 feet and the width of the deck is 13.4 feet.

See also 
 List of bridges on the National Register of Historic Places in Kansas
 National Register of Historic Places listings in Butler County, Kansas

References 

Buildings and structures in Butler County, Kansas
Bridges completed in 1885
Road bridges on the National Register of Historic Places in Kansas
National Register of Historic Places in Butler County, Kansas
Pratt truss bridges in the United States
Iron bridges in the United States